The Paramo Frontino salamander (Bolitoglossa hypacra) is a species of salamander in the family Plethodontidae. It is endemic to the Western Ranges of the Colombian Andes (Cordillera Occidental) where it is known from the area of its type locality, Páramo Frontino. It is also known from the Colibri del Sol Bird Reserve near Urrao. both areas are in the Antioquia Department.

Description
The overall dorsal coloration is dark brown, getting lighter (gray brown) ventrally. There is coarse yellow to yellow-range dorsal speckling, and large, scattered yellow lateral spots, some of them extending onto the venter. The tail is sparsely spotted. The hands and feet are greatly reduced webbing.

Habitat and conservation
The assessment by the International Union for Conservation of Nature (IUCN) states that the type locality is within the Paramillo National Natural Park, although this does not agree with the definition of Páramo Frontino elsewhere.

References

Bolitoglossa
Amphibians of the Andes
Amphibians of Colombia
Endemic fauna of Colombia
Páramo fauna
Amphibians described in 1962
Taxa named by David B. Wake
Taxonomy articles created by Polbot